The Letter Black, formerly known as Breaking the Silence, is an American Christian rock band that was formed in 2006 in Uniontown, Pennsylvania. The band consists of lead vocalist Sarah Anthony; her husband, lead guitarist and vocalist Mark Anthony; bassist Matt Beal and drummer William Fowler.

History 

The Letter Black started out as a praise team at their local church with Sarah and her husband Mark as a duo on vocals under the name "Breaking the Silence". Later when they were signed to Tooth & Nail Records they changed the name of the band to "The Letter Black". In 2008, Sarah Anthony was featured on the Pillar album For the Love of the Game, singing on the track "I Fade Away". The band often does 150 shows or more a year and has shared the stage with bands such as Skillet, Decyfer Down, Red, and Hawk Nelson. They performed as the opening act for Skillet in the "2010 Awake and Alive Tour" and for the Thousand Foot Krutch "Welcome to the Masquerade Tour".

The band's debut album, Hanging On By a Thread was released on May 4, 2010 through Tooth & Nail records, putting The Letter Black as number 8 in the iTunes rock section in the same day.

A remix album titled Hanging On by a Remix was released on May 22, 2012.

In early 2013, the band was reported to be recording new material for their second studio album, later revealed to be called Rebuild. The first single for the new album, "Sick Charade", was released on October 3, 2012. "The Only One" was released in February 2013 and "Pain Killer" was released on September 10, 2013. The album was initially scheduled to be released on April 23, 2013, however, on April 17, the album was postponed because the band decided to write three new songs for the album. The album was released on November 12, 2013.

On November 19, 2016, the band previewed a new song on their Facebook page for their upcoming fourth studio album which would be released by early 2017. According to the band, this would be their heaviest album to date. They announced that they had left Tooth & Nail Records and would record their next album independently. The band ran a successful $25,000 Kickstarter campaign to record their next album. The band later signed with EMP Music Group on March 13, 2017. They also announced the album title revealed to be Pain and the cover art was also revealed. The album was released on May 26, 2017. The first single, "Last Day That I Cared", premiered on Revolver on April 30, 2017. A lyric video for "Rock's Not Dead" was released on May 19, 2017.

In April 2020, Mark and Sarah Anthony announced that they signed with Rockfest Records. On December 13, drummer Justin Brown left the band to be replaced by Will Fowler.

Other media 

In February 2013, Mark and Sarah Anthony signed with VIP Ink Publishing for an autobiography.

Band members 
Current members
 Sarah Anthony – lead vocals (2006–present)
 Mark Anthony – lead guitar, vocals (2006–present)
 Matt Beal – bass guitar (2006–present)
 Will Fowler – drums (2020–present)
 Brandon Jordan - rhythm guitar (2021-present)

Former members 
 Justin Brown – drums (2012–2017)

Touring musicians
 Ty Dietzler – rhythm guitar (2009–2010)
 Keith Anselmo – drums (2010)
 Mike Motter – drums (2017)
 Daniel Hegerle - drums (2017-2018)

Discography

Studio albums

EPs 

 Breaking the Silence EP (2009)
 Hanging on by a Thread Sessions Vol. 1 (2011)
 Hanging on by a Thread Sessions Vol. 2 (2011)

Other releases 

 Hanging On By a Remix (2012) Tooth & Nail Records

Singles

References

External links 

American alternative metal musical groups
American Christian rock groups
American nu metal musical groups
American post-grunge musical groups
Female-fronted musical groups
Hard rock musical groups from Pennsylvania
Musical groups established in 2006
Musical quartets